Acrothamnus colensoi is a plant species from the family Ericaceae and is endemic to New Zealand. 

It is a short shrub that grow to approximately 50 cm of tall, and that can spread to form mounds of up to 2 m across. Fruit are round and are white, pink or dark red in colour. It can be found in both the North and South Islands, in scrub, tussock grassland and peat bogs, south of the Kaingaroa Forest.

Acrothamnus colensoi was named in honour of William Colenso, a New Zealand missionary, botanist and politician.

References 

Flora of New Zealand
Plants described in 1864
Endemic flora of New Zealand
Epacridoideae